Mark Godfrey is an American para-alpine skier. He represented the United States at the 1988 Winter Paralympics in alpine skiing.

He won the silver medal in three events: in the Men's Downhill LW1 event, the Men's Giant Slalom LW1 event and the Men's Slalom LW1 event.

References 

Living people
Year of birth missing (living people)
Place of birth missing (living people)
Paralympic alpine skiers of the United States
American male alpine skiers
Alpine skiers at the 1988 Winter Paralympics
Medalists at the 1988 Winter Paralympics
Paralympic silver medalists for the United States
Paralympic medalists in alpine skiing
20th-century American people